Britz-Süd is a Berlin U-Bahn station located on the .
It was opened in 1963 and constructed by W.Düttmann. Characteristics are the grey tiles on the walls. Until 2003 this station only had a southern entrance. In 2003 the northern entrance was opened due to BVG safety policies.  The station is only 3,5m below the street. The next station is Johannisthaler Chaussee.

Notes 

U7 (Berlin U-Bahn) stations
Buildings and structures in Neukölln
Railway stations in Germany opened in 1963